Saleem Khan or Saleem Khan Khel is a town and Union Council of Swabi District in Khyber-Pakhtunkhwa, Pakistan.

Demographics 
The area is divided into two major chams(boroughs) of including ‘Behzad-Khel Cham’ and ‘Mir-Ahmed-Khel Cham’ both with various sub-sects living in i.e. the first one, to the north includes Behzadkhel, Deewankhel and Khankhel etc. while the second to the south hosts Mirahmadkhel, Shah-Khan-khel, Yarakhel, Kandarkhel and Kamral.

The place settled by the Khankhels is called Gharghashti and is believed by many to be the historical epicentre of the Gharghashti() confederacy. 

More than 40,000 people live in Saleem Khan (according to an unofficial of 2017 national census). The population of the village is increasing rapidly.

Geography 
The Stefa canal crosses outskirts of the village. The canal goes underground for almost three kilometers.

Economy 
Inhabitants mostly depend on agriculture. Mining, cattle farms, poultry farm, Crops grown include wheat, maize, sugar cane, peas and tobacco. About 50% of the youth work overseas, especially in the United Arab Emirates, Saudi Arabia, Oman and the town is dependent on remittances from these overseas workers.

Surroundings

Outskirts of the village include Namar khata, Kaglaich, Sore Ghar, Khadar Abad, Abo Banda, Janak, Major Banda, Abbazo, Palodand, Karra, Khadi Mera, Umar Khel, Dewan Khel, Aurangabad, Fazalabad, Reshtinai, Bakar,Nursary Abad,
Chapai (Qazi abad) and Petai. 

Saleem Khan is surrounded by other villages, including Maneri (south), Gohati (west), Dagai (East) Totalai (north) and Naro (southwest).

Politics 
It has three electoral wards: Village Council: 1.VC-Center, 2. VC-West and 3. VC-East

Education 
The literacy rate is 80-85% at primary school age, 60-65% at secondary school age and at college age these values are very low because every year young people leave the country to work. Thirteen primary schools for boys and nine primary schools for girls, one high, one middle school for boys & one higher secondary school for boys and one high school and two middle schools for girls are located there. Five private schools work there. Six large and many small Islamic madrasas are there, producing many Hufazi kiram and Ulema e kiram.The first qualified Engg of the village after independence was Engg Nawar Khan who did his BE(Electrical) in 1971 from UET,Peshawar.

 See also: 

Swabi District
Slam khan is a compound word of the Pashto, Germanic and Vedic languages. Slam khan is a locative noun with absolute topographical and functional meaning. it's never been  a Saleem khan. With the reference of toponym, Slam Khan is the adjectival form of the specific place-name.

References

External links
Khyber-Pakhtunkhwa Government website section on Lower Dir
United Nations
HAJJ website Uploads
PBS paiman.jsi.com

Populated places in Swabi District
Union councils of Khyber Pakhtunkhwa
Union Councils of Swabi District